Gonga are an English stoner metal band from Bristol, England.

History
The band formed early 1998 and debuted live in 2001 at Shambala Festival held in Somerset, England. They released their self-titled debut album in 2003 through Invada Records. After recording sophomore album II: Transmigration, lead vocalist Joe Volk left the band in 2007 and joined Crippled Black Phoenix. As an instrumental three-piece, full-length album Concrescence followed in 2013 through new imprint ToneHenge Recordings.

For Record Store Day 2014 the band released 12" single "Black Sabbeth" containing a cover of "Black Sabbath" featuring guest vocals by Beth Gibbons of Portishead.

Discography

Studio albums

Extended plays

Singles
 "Stratofortress" (2003)
 "Mosquitos" (2004)
 "From Under the Trees" (2004)
 "Black Sabbeth" (Feat. Beth Gibbons) (2014)

References

External links
 
 

Musical groups from Bristol
Musical groups established in 1998
English stoner rock musical groups
English heavy metal musical groups
British musical trios